Keyvius Nathaniel Sampson (born January 6, 1991) is an American professional baseball pitcher for the Uni-President Lions of the Chinese Professional Baseball League (CPBL). He previously played in Major League Baseball (MLB) for the Cincinnati Reds and the KBO League for the Hanwha Eagles.

Career

San Diego Padres
Sampson was drafted by the San Diego Padres in the fourth round of the 2009 Major League Baseball Draft. In 2010, he went 12–3 with a 2.90 earned run average and 143 strikeouts in 118 innings pitched. He started the 2013 with the Triple-A Tucson Padres but was demoted to Double-A San Antonio Missions after posting an 8.03 ERA. He was promoted back to Triple-A on August 7, 2013, after going 10–4 with a 2.26 ERA in Double-A. He was added to the Padres 40-man roster on November 20, 2013. Sampson was designated for assignment on December 29, 2014.

Cincinnati Reds
On January 8, 2015, he was claimed off waivers by the Cincinnati Reds. The Reds promoted Sampson to the major leagues on July 30. He was designated for assignment on April 20, 2016, when they called up Drew Hayes. Sampsons contract was purchased by the Reds when the Reds placed Homer Bailey on the 60-Day DL on May 18, 2016. On November 28, 2016, Sampson was designated for assignment. He was non-tendered on December 2.

Arizona Diamondbacks
On December 17, 2016, Sampson signed a minor league contract with the Arizona Diamondbacks that included an invitation to spring training. He was released on June 15, 2017.

Texas Rangers
On June 16, 2017, Sampson signed a minor league deal with the Texas Rangers. He was released the next day.

Miami Marlins
On June 26, 2017, Sampson signed a minor league contract with the Miami Marlins. He elected free agency on November 6, 2017.

Hanwha Eagles
On November 13, 2017, Sampson signed with the Hanwha Eagles of the KBO League. He became a free agent following the 2018 season.

San Francisco Giants
On January 5, 2019, Sampson signed a minor league deal with the San Francisco Giants. He became a free agent following the 2019 season.

Chicago White Sox
On April 2, 2021, Sampson signed a minor league contract with the Chicago White Sox organization. Sampson posted a 6.43 ERA in 8 appearances between the Low-A Kannapolis Cannon Ballers and the Triple-A Charlotte Knights before he was released on July 20.

Kansas City Monarchs
On July 28, 2021, Sampson signed with the Kansas City Monarchs of the American Association of Professional Baseball.

Lexington Legends
On April 21, 2022, Sampson was traded to the Lexington Legends of the Atlantic League of Professional Baseball.

Uni-President Lions
On July 7, 2022, Sampson signed with the Uni-President Lions of the Chinese Professional Baseball League.

References

External links

1991 births
Living people
African-American baseball players
American expatriate baseball players in South Korea
Arizona League Giants players
Arizona League Padres players
Baseball players from Florida
Charlotte Knights players
Cincinnati Reds players
El Paso Chihuahuas players
Eugene Emeralds players
Fort Wayne TinCaps players
Hanwha Eagles players
Kannapolis Cannon Ballers players
KBO League pitchers
Louisville Bats players
Major League Baseball pitchers
New Orleans Baby Cakes players
Pensacola Blue Wahoos players
Peoria Javelinas players
People from Ocala, Florida
Reno Aces players
Richmond Flying Squirrels players
San Antonio Missions players
Tucson Padres players
21st-century African-American sportspeople
Águilas de Mexicali players
American expatriate baseball players in Mexico
American expatriate baseball players in Taiwan
Uni-President Lions players